Lady and the Tramp is a 2019 American musical romance film directed by Charlie Bean and written by Andrew Bujalski and Kari Granlund, and produced by Walt Disney Pictures and Taylor Made, and distributed by Walt Disney Studios Motion Pictures. The film is a live-action/CGI hybrid remake of Walt Disney’s 1955 animated film of the same name, which was based on the 1945 Cosmopolitan magazine story of "Happy Dan, the Cynical Dog" by Ward Greene. The film stars the voices of Tessa Thompson, Justin Theroux, Janelle Monáe, and Sam Elliott with the human characters portrayed by Thomas Mann, Kiersey Clemons, Yvette Nicole Brown, F. Murray Abraham, Adrian Martinez, and Ken Jeong. It is dedicated to storyboard artist Chris Reccardi, who died on May 2, 2019.

Lady and the Tramp was released on November 12, 2019 on Disney+, making it the first Disney remake not to be released theatrically, but instead only on a streaming service. The film received mixed reviews from critics with praise for its performances and voice acting, but criticism for its visual effects, screenplay, and pacing.

Plot
On Christmas Day, Jim Dear gives his wife Darling, an American Cocker Spaniel puppy, whom she names Lady. Lady grows up and befriends the neighbors' dogs: elderly Bloodhound Trusty and feisty Scottish Terrier Jacqueline, AKA "Jock".

Meanwhile, a Schnauzer-mix named Tramp spends his days wandering the streets, stealing food and causing trouble for local dogcatcher Elliot, who has labeled Tramp "vicious" and become obsessed with catching him. After reluctantly freeing his friends Peg and Bull from Elliot's cart, Tramp hides from Elliot in Lady's neighborhood. Having been shooed away from Darling's baby shower by Darling's aunt Sarah and not realizing why her owners are neglecting her, Lady mistakes Tramp's voice for Trusty's and confides in him. Tramp deduces that Darling is pregnant, and warns Lady that "when a baby moves in, a dog moves out". Upon discovering Tramp's identity, Lady sends him away and dismisses his claims. After the baby girl Lulu is born, the couple becomes busier than ever and Lady begins to wonder if Tramp was right.

Later, Jim Dear and Darling leave for an extended visit to Jim Dear's sister and ask Aunt Sarah to dog-sit. While Aunt Sarah is upstairs, her two Devon Rex cats demolish the living room and pin the deed on Lady. Aunt Sarah immediately takes Lady to a pet store in order to buy a muzzle. Lady escapes into an alley, is confronted by vicious street dog Isaac. She is saved by Tramp.

The two dogs spend the rest of the day around the city, and have spaghetti and meatballs for dinner at Tony's Restaurant. Lady confesses she is doubtful whether her owners still want her, and Tramp reveals he once had owners, but was dumped after they had a child.

Their conversation is interrupted by Elliot, who accidentally captures Lady instead of Tramp, and brings her to the dog pound. Peg and Bull, once again captured, discuss Tramp's self-serving nature with Lady, causing her to question why he did not save her from Elliot. Fortunately, Jim Dear and Darling track Lady down at the pound and bring her home. When Sarah states that they should have Lady trained better next time upon her departure, Jim quotes to her "there won't be a next time". Jim and Darling allow Lady to bond with Lulu.

Learning that Peg and Bull have been adopted from the pound and regretful that he could not do more to save Lady from Elliot, Tramp returns to Lady's house. Lady decides her place is with her owners and Tramp leaves. A rat suddenly enters Lulu's nursery, and Lady starts barking frantically, just as Elliot arrives to warn Jim Dear that he has tracked Tramp to their house. Jim Dear locks Lady in a room, and Lady calls for Tramp, who returns and sneaks inside to the nursery. In the ensuing battle, Tramp is injured, but manages to kill the rat. Lulu, whose crib was knocked over in the struggle, starts to cry loudly. Thinking that Tramp attacked Lulu, Jim Dear hands him over to Elliot to be euthanized.

As soon as she is released, Lady leads Jim Dear and Darling to the dead rat, then sets out with Jock and Trusty to rescue Tramp. Realizing the truth, Jim Dear and Darling follow in their motorcar. Elliot's horses get scared and crash his cart when the dogs attack, and Tramp is injured in the wreck. Jim Dear and Darling catch up and adopt Tramp as their own to protect him from Elliot. The family celebrates Christmas together, and Tramp receives his new collar and license. Outside in the yard, Trusty entertains Dodge and Ollie (two puppies adopted by Jock's owner) with the story of how he helped save “a poor stray with a heart of gold”.

Cast
 Thomas Mann as Jim Dear, a musician who is married to Darling.
 Kiersey Clemons as Darling, who is married to Jim Dear.
 Yvette Nicole Brown as Aunt Sarah, Darling’s aunt who dislikes dogs and prefers cats.
 F. Murray Abraham as Tony, the owner of Tony’s Restaurant.
 Adrian Martinez as Elliot, a dog catcher that targets Tramp.
 Ken Jeong as the doctor who delivers Jim Dear and Darling's baby.
 Arturo Castro as Joe, a chef who works for Tony.
 Kate Kneeland as Jock's owner, an avid painter and photographer.
 Darryl W. Handy as Trusty's owner.
 Parvesh Cheena as the pet shop owner who sells Aunt Sarah a muzzle.

Voices
 Tessa Thompson as Lady, an American Cocker Spaniel.
 Justin Theroux as Tramp, a Schnauzer-mix.
 Sam Elliott as Trusty, an old Bloodhound.
 Ashley Jensen as Jock (Jacqueline), a feisty Scottish Terrier.
 Janelle Monáe as Peg, a Lhasa Apso.
 Benedict Wong as Bull, a Bulldog.
 Nate "Rocket" Wonder and Roman GianArthur as Devon and Rex, a pair of Devon Rex cats.
 Clancy Brown as Isaac, a vicious mastiff-mix that Tramp saves Lady from.
 Jentel Hawkins as Dame, a street dog.
 James Bentley as Chance, a street dog.
 Ara and Aemon O'Keefe as Dodge and Ollie, two con-artist puppies.

Production

Development
On February 8, 2018, it was announced that Walt Disney Pictures was developing a live-action adaptation of the 1955 animated film Lady and the Tramp. The film was expected to premiere on Disney+, Disney's streaming service that launched in late 2019. On March 19, 2018, it was announced that film was set to be directed by Charlie Bean from a screenplay by Andrew Bujalski with Brigham Taylor serving as a producer.

Casting
In July 2018, it was announced that Ashley Jensen, Justin Theroux, and Sam Elliott had been cast in the voice roles of Jock, Tramp, and Trusty, respectively. Additionally, it was reported that Kiersey Clemons was in talks for the live-action role of Darling, Lady's human owner. In August 2018, it was reported that Tessa Thompson and Benedict Wong had been cast in the voice roles of Lady and Bull, respectively, and that Thomas Mann had been cast in the live-action role of Jim Dear. In September 2018, it was announced that Yvette Nicole Brown and Adrian Martinez had been cast in the live-action roles of Aunt Sarah and the dog-catcher Elliot, respectively. In October 2018, it was announced Arturo Castro had been cast in the live-action role of Marco and that Janelle Monáe had been cast in the voice role of Peg.

The production utilized real dogs to portray the film's titular characters with a dog named Rose portraying Lady in the film. About three months prior to the start of filming, the animals started their training for the film. Tramp is physically portrayed by Monte, a rescue dog, while Jackie was renamed Jock shortly before filming began.

Filming
Voice work for the film begin in July 2018 with principal photography of the film's live-action externally filmed portions last from September 10, 2018 to November 18, 2018 in Savannah, Georgia. Locations were set to include Johnson Square, Wright Square and The Cathedral of St. John the Baptist. Filming on an indoor soundstage took place through December 2018.

Music 

The film was going to feature a new version of "The Siamese Cat Song", performed by Janelle Monáe. The song was to be re-written by Nate "Rocket" Wonder, Roman GianArthur, and Monáe due to both its modern-day perceived racist connotations and to fit the characters' depictions in the film. The song was ultimately reworked as a blues song titled "What a Shame".  Monáe also performed two new songs for the film. On August 23, 2019, Joseph Trapanese was revealed to be composing the film's score. The soundtrack, featuring Trapanse's score, as well as songs from the original film performed by the remake's cast, was released on November 12, 2019.

Marketing
On August 23, 2019, a first trailer was released. On October 14, 2019, a second trailer featuring new footage as well as the song "He's a Tramp" was released. On November 6, 2019, a featurette which presented each of the dogs chosen to portray the main characters and how they were all rescued from animal shelters and foster homes was released.

Novelization
Unlike Ward Greene, a tie-in novelization of the film written by Elizabeth Rudnick was published by Disney Publishing Worldwide on January 28, 2020.

Release
Lady and the Tramp was released on November 12, 2019 exclusively as part of the launch content library for Disney's streaming service, Disney+.

Reception

Critical response
The site's critics consensus reads: "Lady and the Tramps cute dogs and likable cast work well enough, but the live-action update lacks some of the magic that made the original 1955 film such a delight." On Metacritic, the film has a weighted average score of 48 out of 100 based on reviews from 13 critics, indicating "mixed or average reviews."

In a mixed review, Michael Phillips of the Chicago Tribune wrote, "The worst of this new Lady and the Tramp comes when the script piles on the strenuous comic action, followed by ill-advised dark shadows."

Accolades

References

External links

 
 
 

2019 films
2010s romance films
Remakes of American films
American romance films
Children's comedy-drama films
2010s English-language films
Disney film remakes
Live-action films based on Disney's animated films
Disney+ original films
Films about dogs
Films about pets
Films based on adaptations
Films directed by Charlie Bean (filmmaker)
Films scored by Joseph Trapanese
Films set in 1909
Films shot in Savannah, Georgia
Walt Disney Pictures films
2010s American films
Lady and the Tramp